Chembur is a monorail station and the northern terminus of Line 1 of the Mumbai Monorail serving the Chembur suburb of Mumbai, India. It was opened to the public on 2 February 2014, as part of the first phase of Line 1.

The Chembur monorail station is connected with a skywalk to the Chembur railway station.

References

Mumbai Monorail stations
Railway stations in India opened in 2014